William Austin Forsyth (June 20, 1917 – June 19, 2001) was a Canadian politician who represented Saskatoon Nutana South as a Liberal in the Legislative Assembly of Saskatchewan from 1967 to 1971. He was born in Saskatoon, of Scottish parentage and was a veteran of the Royal Air Force in World War II. Forsyth attended the University of Saskatchewan and University of California and was an optometrist. Dr. Forsyth was one of the founders of the Saskatoon Foundation in 1970, now known as Saskatoon Community Foundation.

References

1917 births
2001 deaths
20th-century Canadian politicians
Politicians from Saskatoon
Saskatchewan Liberal Party MLAs
Canadian World War II pilots
University of Saskatchewan alumni
University of California alumni